Fausto Landini (born 28 June 1951 in San Giovanni Valdarno) is an Italian professional football coach and a former player, who played as a striker. He currently manages the youth team of A.C. Sangiovannese 1927.

Landini played for Juventus during 1970.

His older brother Spartaco Landini played for the Italy national football team.

References

1951 births
Living people
Italian footballers
Serie A players
A.S. Roma players
Juventus F.C. players
Bologna F.C. 1909 players
Benevento Calcio players
A.S.D. Sangiovannese 1927 players
Italian football managers
Association football forwards